Zanthoxylum davyi, the forest knobwood, is a dioecious species of plant in the family Rutaceae. It is native to the Western Cape, Eastern Cape, KwaZulu-Natal, Mpumalanga and Limpopo provinces of South Africa, western Eswatini and eastern Zimbabwe. It occurs in coastal and mistbelt forests, and grows some 10 to 24 m tall.

Bole and bark
Their sturdy, straight trunks are heavily armed with hornlike knobs.

Foliage and flowers
The compound leaves are 5 to 30 cm long.

Species interactions and uses
Birds eat the fruit.

Similar species
Similar species are the smaller Z. capense which occurs in mostly dryer inland regions, and Z. leprieurii which is native to sand forests of subtropical lowlands.

References

Flora of Africa
davyi